Italian Squash Federation ("Federazione Italiana Giuoco Squash" in Italian), also known as the FIGS is an organisation set up in 1976 that takes charge of the organisation, co-ordination and promotion of squash in Italy.

External links

See also
 Italy men's national squash team

Squ
National members of the World Squash Federation
Squash in Italy